Ryan James Broom (born 4 September 1996) is a Welsh professional footballer who plays as a midfielder for League One side Cheltenham Town.

Playing career

Bristol Rovers
Broom graduated from Bristol Rovers' youth set-up in 2015 and made his professional football debut in August 2015 as a second-half substitute during a League Cup defeat to Birmingham City. On 19 March 2016 he made his Football League debut as a second-half substitute against his home town club and local rivals Newport County which Rovers won 4–1. He scored his first goals for Bristol Rovers when he scored twice in an EFL Trophy tie against Wycombe Wanderers on 29 August 2017.

On 7 October 2016, Broom joined Bath City on a one-month loan. He made his debut for the club the following day where he scored in a 1–1 draw with Eastbourne Borough.

He was released by Bristol Rovers at the end of the 2017–18 season.

Cheltenham Town
On 18 May 2018, Broom joined League Two side Cheltenham Town on a one-year deal. On 17 May 2019, after making 48 appearances in his debut season with the club, Broom signed a new two-year contract with the club. The 2019–20 season ended in disappointment for the club when they lost in the play-offs semi-final to eventual winners Northampton Town. After winning the first leg 2–0 away from home, a 3–0 home defeat saw Cheltenham knocked out. On a personal level, Broom won three awards in the club's end of season awards, winning the Mira Showers' Player of the Year, Norwegian Robins' Player of the Year and Players' Player of the Year.

Peterborough United
On 24 August 2020, Broom joined League One club Peterborough United for an undisclosed fee, signing a three-year deal. On 5 September 2020, Broom made his Peterborough debut against former club Cheltenham as his former club knocked his new team out of the EFL Cup. His first goal for the club came when he scored the third goal in a 3–1 victory over Swindon Town just 4 minutes after coming off of the bench.

Burton Albion (loan)
On 1 February 2021, Broom joined League One side Burton Albion on loan for the remainder of the 2020–21 season. His first goal came on 17 April 2021, a 90+3 minute equaliser against Plymouth Argyle.

Plymouth Argyle (loan)
On 29 July 2021, Broom joined League One side Plymouth Argyle on loan for the 2021–22 season with a view to a permanent move.

Cheltenham Town
On September 1st 2022, Broom returned to League One side Cheltenham Town signing a one-year deal.

Career statistics

References

External links

1996 births
Living people
Footballers from Newport, Wales
Welsh footballers
Association football midfielders
English Football League players
Southern Football League players
National League (English football) players
Bristol Rovers F.C. players
Taunton Town F.C. players
Bath City F.C. players
Eastleigh F.C. players
Cheltenham Town F.C. players
Peterborough United F.C. players
Burton Albion F.C. players
Plymouth Argyle F.C. players